Nicholas Valentino McCreath is a Jamaican footballer midfielder who plays for Scotiabank F.C. in the KSAFA/Western Sports Business House football league.

Youth
McCreath graduated from Kingston College High School in Jamaica.  As a youth, he played for Tivoli Gardens F.C. and the Harbor View F.C. second division team.  He attended the University of Rhode Island, playing on the men's soccer team from 1998 to 2001.  He was a 2000 Third Team and 2001 First Team All American. He graduated with a bachelor's degree in business administration.

Professional
McCreath played for Harbor View F.C. from 2002 to 2004, Rivoli United F.C. from 2004 to 2005, Tivoli Gardens F.C. from 2005 to 2007 and August Town F.C. from 2007 to 2009.

National team
McCreath has played for the Jamaican U-17, U-20, U-23 and senior national teams.

References

External links
 University of Rhode Island: Nicholas McCreath

Living people
Sportspeople from Kingston, Jamaica
Jamaican footballers
Jamaican expatriate footballers
Rivoli United F.C. players
Harbour View F.C. players
Tivoli Gardens F.C. players
Rhode Island Rams men's soccer players
August Town F.C. players
All-American men's college soccer players
Association football forwards
Year of birth missing (living people)
Jamaica international footballers